Akanthophoreidae is a family of crustaceans belonging to the order Tanaidacea.

Genera:
 Akanthophoreus Sieg, 1986
 Brixia (crustacean) Jóźwiak, Drumm, Bird & Błażewicz, 2018
 Chauliopleona Dojiri & Sieg, 1997
 Mimicarhaphura Sieg, 1986
 Parakanthophoreus Larsen & Araújo-Silva, 2014
 Paraleptognathia Kudinova-Pasternak, 1981
 Saurotipleona Bird, 2015
 Stenotanais Bird & Holdich, 1984
 Tumidochelia Knight, Larsen & Heard, 2003

References

Tanaidacea
Crustacean families